Forsgate Country Club is a country club located in Monroe Township, New Jersey. The club has two distinctively different eighteen hole golf courses, an historic clubhouse with two dining facilities, tennis court, a pool and fitness center.  The club is private for golf and dining, but is available to non-members for meetings, catering, and golf outings. The club and its associated housing developments comprise the Forsgate census-designated place.

Banks Course 
The Banks Course was created by Charles “Steamshovel” Banks in 1931.

Banks Course Featured Hole 12 
This Horseshoe completely surrounded by bunkers, this par three is a copy of many elevated short holes in Scotland. "Buried elephants" is one way to describe the horseshoe-shaped undulation.

Palmer Course 
Originally created by Hal Purdy in 1961, but redesigned in 1995 by the Arnold Palmer Group and again in 2007 by Steven Kay.

References

1931 establishments in New Jersey
Golf clubs and courses in New Jersey
Buildings and structures in Middlesex County, New Jersey
Monroe Township, Middlesex County, New Jersey
Sports venues completed in 1931